Sir Roger Cave, 2nd Baronet (21 September 1655 – 11 October 1703) was an English politician and baronet.

Life
Roger Cave was the oldest son of Sir Thomas Cave, 1st Baronet and his second wife Hon. Penelope Wenman, daughter of Thomas Wenman, 2nd Viscount Wenman. In 1671, he succeeded his father as baronet and had Stanford Hall, Leicestershire, built on the site of the old manor house. He was educated at Christ's College, Cambridge.

Cave was High Sheriff of Northamptonshire for 1679–80 and then Member of Parliament (MP) for Coventry from 1685 until 1690.

On 26 March 1676, Cave married firstly Martha Browne, daughter of John Browne, and then secondly Mary Bromley, daughter of Sir William Bromley. He had five sons and two daughters by his first wife and a son and two daughters by his second wife. Cave died in 1703 and was succeeded by his oldest son Sir Thomas Cave, 3rd Baronet.

References

1655 births
1703 deaths
Baronets in the Baronetage of England
High Sheriffs of Northamptonshire
English MPs 1685–1687
English MPs 1689–1690
Members of Parliament for Coventry